This is a list of legislation named for a place, typically the place in which it was passed.

Medieval legislation was traditionally named, in particular, after the place where it was passed. (Medieval governments were itinerant or peripatetic before the end of the fourteenth century). Such popular titles were used to cite legislation in the thirteenth and fourteenth centuries. (The citation of legislation by session did not begin until the end of the fourteenth century; and citation by short titles authorised by statute did not begin until the 1840s.)

United Kingdom and predecessor states
The following Acts are named after the place where they were passed:
Constitutions of Clarendon 1164
Assize of Clarendon 1166
Assize of Northampton 1176
Statute of Merton 1235
Provisions of Oxford 1258
Statute of Kenilworth 1266 (51 & 52 Hen 3) (or Dictum de Kenilworth)
Statute of Marlborough 1267 (at the time known as the Statute of Marlbridge)
Statute of Westminster I 1275
Statute of Gloucester 1278 (6 Edw 1)
Statute of Rutland 1282 (10 Edw 1)
Statute of Acton Burnell 1283 (11 Edw 1)
Statute of Rhuddlan 1284 (or the Statute of Wales)
Statute of Westminster II 1285
Statute of Winchester 1285
Statute of Exeter 1285 or 1286 (13 or 14 Edw 1) 
Statute of Westminster III 1290
Statute of Stamford 1309
Statute of Lincoln 1316 (12 Edw 2) (or the Statute of Lincoln de vice-comitibus or the Statute of Sheriffs)
Statute of Carlisle (15 Edw 2)
Statute of York 1318
Statute of Westminster IV 1320
Statute of Northampton 1328 (2 Edw 3)
Statute of Kilkenny 1367
Second Statute of Northampton (1380)
Statute of Westminster 1931

The following Act is not named after the place where it was passed:
Island of Rockall Act 1972

See also
List of short titles
List of legislation named for a person
Citation of United Kingdom legislation

References
David M Walker. The Oxford Companion to Law. Clarendon Press. Oxford. 1980. p 16. .
Colin Rhys Lovell. English Constitutional and Legal History: A Survey. Oxford University Press. 1962. p 140.
Owen Hood Phillips. "Citation". A First Book of English Law. Fourth Edition. Sweet & Maxwell Limited. New Fetter Lane, London. 1960. Page 98 et seq at pages 98 to 100.
Owen Hood Phillips. The Principles of English Law and the Constitution. 1939. p 102. .
Mr. Serjeant Stephen's New Commentaries on the Laws of England. 14th Ed. 1903. Volume 1. p 35. 12th Ed. 1895. Volume 1. p 67.
Craies and Hardcastle. "Mode of citation of older Acts". Treatise on the Construction and Effect of Statute Law. 2nd Ed. 1892. Section 6 at p 57. There is a fuller list at "Popular or Short Titles of Statutes". p 604.
Henry Raikes. A Popular Sketch of the Origin and Development of the English Constitution. W H Dalton. Cockspur Street, London. 1851. Volume 1. p 144. 
L S C, "Art VIII - Reddie's Historical Notices of Roman Law" (1836) 15 American Jurist and Law Magazine 342 at 346 (July)
George Crabb. A History of English Law. First American Edition. Chauncey Goodrich. Burlington. 1831. pp 5, 222 & 223.
Henry Cary (ed). A Commentary on the Tenures of Littleton. Saunders and Benning. London. 1829. p 47.
1 Blackstone's Commentaries (Hargrave's Edition) 86, note. (Note reproduced in Kerr's Edition, 1857, at p 68 of that edition, and in Wendell's Edition, 1850, at p 85 of that edition, attributing volume 1 to Hargrave).
(1912) 77 The Westminster Review 364 (April)
"The First Winter Meeting" (1905) 26 Proceedings of the Dorset Natural History and Antiquarian Field Club xxvii  

Laws in the United Kingdom
Named